Mohamed Mahbub Alam (1 October 1972 – 4 December 2010) was a Bangladeshi sprinter. In men's 200 metres sprint, he won gold in the 1995 South Asian Games in Madras and silver in the 1999 South Asian Games in Kathmandu. He also earned the national record of 10.54 seconds in the 100 metres sprint which 1996 Bangladesh National Athletics Championship. He received 2013 Bangladesh National Sports Award in the athletics category.

Career
Alam competed in the men's 200 metres at the 2000 Summer Olympics but failed to finish the race. Alam later served as a member of the executive committee of Bangladesh Athletics Federation (BAF).

References

External links
 

1972 births
2010 deaths
Bangladeshi male sprinters
Olympic athletes of Bangladesh
Athletes (track and field) at the 2000 Summer Olympics
Recipients of the Bangladesh National Sports Award
Road incident deaths in Bangladesh
Place of birth missing
Athletes (track and field) at the 1998 Asian Games
South Asian Games gold medalists for Bangladesh
Asian Games competitors for Bangladesh
South Asian Games medalists in athletics
20th-century Bangladeshi people
21st-century Bangladeshi people